Jonathan Chase may refer to:

Jonathan Chase (actor) (born 1979), American actor
Jonathan Chase (colonel) (1732–1800), American Revolutionary War soldier
Jonathan Lyndon Chase (born 1989), American artist

See also
John Chase (disambiguation)